An archivist is an information worker who works in archives. It may also refer to:

 Archivist (band), a post-metal band formed in 2014
 The Archivist, a 1998 novel by Martha Cooley
 Archivist, a Dungeon & Dragons character class
 The Archivist of the United States

See also
 Archive (disambiguation)